Geopoliticus Child Watching the Birth of the New Man is a 1943 painting by Salvador Dalí. The painting was done during Dalí's stay in the United States from 1940 to 1948. It is said to be one of his most recognizable paintings. It is of a man scrambling out of an egg while an adult woman and child look on. The work is currently on view at the Salvador Dalí Museum in St. Petersburg, Florida.

It was reproduced on the cover of the record album Newborn by James Gang.

Dalí provided some abbreviated, mysterious notes about the work: "Parachute, paranaissance, protection, cupola, placenta, Catholicism, egg, earthly distortion, biological ellipse. Geography changes its skin in historic germination."

Subjects and symbolism 
The egg is a common subject in Dalí's work. Early in his career, eggs commonly symbolized hope and love. However, Child Watching the Birth of the New Man and other later works mimics the egg as a Christian symbol of purity and perfection. Dalí uses the leaking yellow "yolk" of the egg to map the world onto the egg.

The man emerging from egg is the "New Man" referenced in the title, and the "Geopoliticus Child" can be seen crouching in the lower right-hand corner.  

The New Man emerges from the egg where North America should be, breaking through the rising power of the US and resting his hand on Europe to support his emergence. South America and Africa are both enlarged relative to Europe, conveying the growing importance of the so-called "third world."

The draped cloth represents the placenta.

The androgynous figure who the Geopoliticus child holds on to is pointing at the New Man, showing the child the "new historical period it will represent."

Provenance 

 Knoedler Gallery, New York
 Stuart Art Gallery, Boston
 Louis E. Stern
 Richard Feignen Gallery, Chicago
 E. and A. Reynolds Morse, Cleveland (Ohio)

References

1943 paintings
Paintings by Salvador Dalí
Maps in art
Paintings of children
Paintings in St. Petersburg, Florida